is a Japanese wrestler. He competed in the men's freestyle 52 kg at the 1996 Summer Olympics.

References

1966 births
Living people
Japanese male sport wrestlers
Olympic wrestlers of Japan
Wrestlers at the 1996 Summer Olympics
Sportspeople from Aomori Prefecture
Asian Games medalists in wrestling
Wrestlers at the 1990 Asian Games
Wrestlers at the 1994 Asian Games
Asian Games silver medalists for Japan
Medalists at the 1990 Asian Games
20th-century Japanese people
21st-century Japanese people
Asian Wrestling Championships medalists